Tomaymycin is an antitumor and antibiotic pyrrolobenzodiazepine with the molecular formula C16H20N2O4. Tomaymycin is produced by the bacterium Streptomyces achromogenes.

References

Further reading 

 
 
 

Antibiotics
Pyrrolobenzodiazepines
O-methylated phenols